Yang Huang (born June 13, 1971) is an American novelist and short story writer. Her debut novel, Living Treasures, was a finalist for the 2008 Bellwether Prize and the 2014 INDIEFAB Book of the Year Awards (now known as the Foreword INDIES). Her short story collection, My Old Faithful, won 2017 Juniper Prize for Fiction. her novel, My Good Son, was the winner of 2020 University of New Orleans Publishing Lab Prize.

Biography
Yang Huang studied applied physics at Tongji University from 1988 to 1990, received a B.S in computer science in 1993 and B.A. in English literature in 1996 from Florida Atlantic University, an M.A in English literature from Boston College in 1998, and an MFA in creative writing from University of Arizona in 2000.

Her stories have been featured in The Asian Pacific American Journal,  Stories for Film, FUTURES, Porcupine Literary Arts Magazine, Nuvein Magazine, and The Evansville Review.

Her short story "A Spell of Spring Dream" was nominated for the Pushcart prize.

Yang Huang works at UC Berkeley. She lives in the San Francisco Bay Area, USA.  She is married with two children.

Works
Living Treasures; Harvard Square Editions 2014, 
My Old Faithful: Stories (Juniper Prize for Fiction); University of Massachusetts Press (February 2, 2018),
My Good Son: A Novel; University of New Orleans Press (May 27, 2021)

References

External links

 Harvard Square Edition Book Page for Living Treasures
 Yang Huang's personal web site

1971 births
Living people
21st-century American novelists
American women short story writers
American short story writers
American women novelists
Morrissey College of Arts & Sciences alumni
University of Arizona alumni
Florida Atlantic University alumni
Tongji University alumni
Novelists from Florida
American short story writers of Chinese descent
Chinese emigrants to the United States
American novelists of Chinese descent
21st-century American women writers
American women writers of Chinese descent